The Walls House, known also as the McCrary House, is a historic house at 406 Jefferson Street in Lonoke, Arkansas.  It is a -story wood-frame structure, with a side-gable roof and weatherboard siding.  Its Colonial Revival styling includes a projecting front portico, with paired Tuscan columns supporting an entablature and balustraded balcony, above which rises a large gabled dormer with exposed rafter ends.  The house was built in 1913 to a design by Charles L. Thompson.

The house was listed on the National Register of Historic Places in 1982.

See also
National Register of Historic Places listings in Lonoke County, Arkansas

References

Houses on the National Register of Historic Places in Arkansas
Colonial Revival architecture in Arkansas
Houses completed in 1913
Houses in Lonoke County, Arkansas
1913 establishments in Arkansas
National Register of Historic Places in Lonoke County, Arkansas
Buildings and structures in Lonoke, Arkansas